Soldier Field is a multi-purpose stadium on the Near South Side of Chicago, Illinois, United States. Opened in 1924 and reconstructed in 2003, the stadium has served as the home of the Chicago Bears of the National Football League (NFL) since 1971, as well as Chicago Fire FC of Major League Soccer (MLS) from 1998 to 2005 and since 2020. The stadium has a football capacity of 61,500, making it the smallest stadium in the NFL. Soldier Field is also the oldest stadium in both the NFL and MLS.

The stadium's interior was rebuilt as part of a major renovation project in 2002, which modernized the facility but lowered its seating capacity, eventually causing it to be delisted as a National Historic Landmark in 2006. Soldier Field has served as the home venue for a number of other sports teams in its history, including the Chicago Cardinals of the NFL and University of Notre Dame football. It hosted the 1994 FIFA World Cup, the 1999 FIFA Women's World Cup, and multiple CONCACAF Gold Cup championships. In 1968, it hosted the inaugural World Games of the Special Olympics, as well as its second World Games in 1970. Other historic events have included large rallies with speeches, including by Amelia Earhart, Franklin D. Roosevelt, and Martin Luther King Jr..

History

On December 3, 1919, Chicago-based architectural firm Holabird & Roche was chosen to design the stadium, which broke ground on August 11, 1922. The stadium cost $13 million to construct (equivalent to $ million in ), a large sum for a sporting venue at that time (in comparison, the Los Angeles Memorial Coliseum had cost less than US$1 million in 1923 dollars). On October 9, 1924, the 53rd anniversary of the Great Chicago Fire, the stadium was officially dedicated as Municipal Grant Park Stadium, although it had hosted a few events before then, including a field day for Chicago police officers on September 6, and the stadium's first football game, between Louisville Male High School and Austin Community Academy High School, on October 4. On November 22, the stadium hosted its first college football game, in which Notre Dame defeated Northwestern University 13–6.

On November 11, 1925, the stadium's name was changed to Soldier Field, in dedication to U.S. soldiers who had died in combat during World War I. Its formal rededication as Soldier Field was held during the 29th annual playing of the Army–Navy Game on November 27, 1926. Several months earlier, in June 1926, the stadium hosted several events during the 28th International Eucharistic Congress.

The stadium's design is in the Neoclassical style, with Doric columns rising above the East and West entrances. In its earliest configuration, Soldier Field was capable of seating 74,280 spectators, and was in the shape of a U. Additional seating could be added along the interior field, upper promenades, and on the large, open field and terrace beyond the north endzone, bringing the seating capacity to over 100,000.

Chicago Bears move in

The Cardinals also used the stadium as their home field for their final season in the city in 1959.

In , the Bears moved into Soldier Field full-time, originally with a three-year commitment. The team previously played home games at Wrigley Field, the home stadium of the Chicago Cubs of Major League Baseball (MLB), but were forced to move to a larger venue due to post-AFL–NFL merger policies requiring that stadium capacities seat at least 50,000 spectators. The Bears had initially intended to build a stadium in Arlington Heights, but the property did not fit the league's specifications.

On September 19, 1971, the Bears played their first home game at Soldier Field, in which they defeated the Pittsburgh Steelers 17–15. In 1978, the Bears and the Chicago Park District agreed to a 20-year lease and renovation of the stadium; both parties pooled their resources for the renovation. The playing surface was AstroTurf from 1971 until 1987, and was replaced with natural grass in 1988. On February 27, 1987, Soldier Field was designated a National Historic Landmark.

Replacement talks
In 1989, Soldier Field's future was in jeopardy after a proposal was created for a "McDome", which was intended to be a domed stadium for the Bears, but was rejected by the Illinois Legislature in 1990. Because of this, Bears president Michael McCaskey considered relocation as a possible factor for a new stadium. The Bears had also purchased options in Hoffman Estates, Elk Grove Village and Aurora. In 1995, McCaskey announced that he and Northwest Indiana developers agreed to construction of an entertainment complex called "Planet Park", which would also include a new stadium. However, the plan was rejected by the Lake County Council, and in 1998, then-Chicago mayor Richard M. Daley proposed that the Bears share Comiskey Park with the Chicago White Sox.

Renovations
Beginning in 1978, the plank seating was replaced by individual seats with backs and armrests. In 1982, a new press box, as well as 60 skyboxes, were added to the stadium, boosting its capacity to 66,030. In 1988, 56 more skyboxes were added, increasing capacity to 66,946. Capacity was slightly increased to 66,950 in 1992. By 1994, however, capacity was slightly reduced to 66,944. During the renovation, seating capacity was reduced to 55,701 by building a grandstand in the open end of the U shape. This moved the field closer to both ends in order to move the fans closer to the field, at the expense of seating capacity.

2002–03 renovation and landmark delisting

In 2001, the Chicago Park District, which owns the structure, faced substantial criticism when it announced plans to alter the stadium with a design by Benjamin T. Wood and Carlos Zapata of Wood + Zapata in Boston. The stadium grounds were reconfigured by local architecture firm Lohan Associate, led by architect Dirk Lohan, grandson of Ludwig Mies van der Rohe. The stadium's interior would be demolished and reconstructed while the exterior would be preserved in an example of facadism. A similar endeavor of constructing a new stadium within the confines of a historic stadium's exterior was done with Leipzig's Red Bull Arena, which similarly built a modern stadium while preserving the exterior of the original Zentralstadion. Fans and radio hosts, such as WSCR's Mike North, criticized the small seating capacity of the new venue, and others have criticized the Park District's lack of care to the field surface after the first seasonal freeze and a refusal to consider a new-generation artificial surface, leaving the Bears to play on dead grass.

On January 19, 2002, the night of the Bears' playoff loss to the Philadelphia Eagles, demolition began as tailgate fires still burned in trash cans in the parking lots. The removal of 24,000 stadium seats in 36 hours by Archer Seating Clearinghouse, a speed record never exceeded since, was the first step in building the new Soldier Field. Nostalgic Bears fans recalling the team's glory seasons (especially 1985), as well as some retired players, picked up their seats in the South parking lot. The foremen on the job were Grant Wedding, who installed the seats himself in 1979, and Mark Wretschko, an executive for the factory who made the new seats. As Soldier Field underwent renovation, the Bears spent the 2002 NFL season playing their home games at Memorial Stadium at the University of Illinois. On September 29, the Bears played their first game at the renovated Soldier Field, in which they were defeated by the Green Bay Packers, 38–23. The total funding for the renovation cost $632 million; taxpayers were responsible for $432 million while the Chicago Bears and the NFL contributed $200 million.

Several writers and columnists attacked the Soldier Field renovation project as an aesthetic, political and financial nightmare. The project received mixed reviews within the architecture community, with criticism from civic and preservation groups. Prominent architect and native Chicagoan Stanley Tigerman called it "a fiasco. Chicago Tribune architecture critic Blair Kamin dubbed it the "Eyesore on the Lake Shore," while others called it "Monstrosity on the Midway" or "Mistake by the Lake". The renovation was described by some as if "a spaceship landed on the stadium". Lohan responded:

I would never say that Soldier Field is an architectural landmark. Nobody has copied it; nobody has learned from it. People like it for nostalgic reasons. They remember the games and parades and tractor pulls and veterans' affairs they've seen there over the years. I wouldn't do this if it were the Parthenon. But this isn't the Parthenon.

Proponents of the renovation argued it was direly needed because of aging and cramped facilities. The New York Times named the renovated Soldier Field one of the five best new buildings of 2003. Soldier Field was given an award in design excellence by the American Institute of Architects in 2004.

On September 23, 2004, as a result of the renovation, a 10-member federal advisory committee unanimously recommended that Soldier Field be delisted as a National Historic Landmark. The recommendation to delist was prepared by Carol Ahlgren, an architectural historian at the National Park Service's Midwest Regional Office in Omaha, Nebraska, who was quoted in Preservation Online stating, "if we had let this stand, I believe it would have lowered the standard of National Historic Landmarks throughout the country. ... If we want to keep the integrity of the program, let alone the landmarks, we really had no other recourse." The stadium lost the landmark designation on February 17, 2006.

Subsequent developments

In May 2012, Soldier Field became the first NFL stadium to achieve LEED status, a program intended to award environmentally sustainable buildings.

On July 9, 2019, the Chicago Fire of Major League Soccer (MLS) announced an agreement with the Village of Bridgeview to release the team from their lease with SeatGeek Stadium, where they had played since 2006. As a result, the Fire returned to Soldier Field for the 2020 MLS season.

On June 17, 2021, the Chicago Bears submitted a bid for the Arlington Park Racetrack property, making a move from Soldier Field to a new venue more possible. On September 29, the Bears and Churchill Downs Incorporated announced that they had reached an agreement for the property.

On September 5, 2022, the Kentucky bluegrass was replaced with Bermuda grass after poor field conditions were noted in an August 13 preseason game.

Public transportation
The closest Chicago 'L' station to Soldier Field is the Roosevelt station on the Orange, Green and Red lines. The Chicago Transit Authority also operates the #128 Soldier Field Express bus route to the stadium from Ogilvie Transportation Center and Union Station. There are also two Metra stations close by: the Museum Campus/11th Street station on the Metra Electric Line, which also is used by South Shore Line trains, and 18th Street, which is only served by the Metra Electric Line. Pace also provides access from the Northwest, West and Southwest suburbs to the stadium with four express routes from Schaumburg, Lombard, Bolingbrook, Burr Ridge, Palos Heights and Oak Lawn.

Events

Football

Single events

The stadium hosted its first football game on October 4, 1924, between Louisville Male High School and Chicago's Austin Community Academy High School; Louisville's team won 26–0.
Over 100,000 spectators attended the 1926 Army–Navy Game. It would decide the national championship, as Navy entered undefeated and Army had lost only to Notre Dame. The game lived up to its hype, and even though it ended in a 21–21 tie, Navy was awarded the national championship.
The all-time collegiate attendance record of 123,000+ was established November 26, 1927, as Notre Dame beat the USC Trojans 7–6.  Subsequently, in 2016, 150,000+ attended a game between the Virginia Tech Hokies and Tennessee Volunteers at Bristol Speedway.
Austin defeated Leo to win the 1937 Chicago Prep Bowl; another contender for the highest attendance ever (estimated at over 120,000 spectators). The Chicago Prep Bowl games are held at Soldier Field yearly on the day after Thanksgiving. The bowl game is older than the IHSA state championship tournament held since the 1960s.
The stadium was host to 41 College All-Star Games, an exhibition between the previous year's NFL champion (or, in its final years, Super Bowl champion) and a team of collegiate all-star players prior to their reporting to their new professional teams training camps. This game was discontinued after the 1976 NFL Season. The final game in 1976 was halted in the third quarter when a torrential thunderstorm broke out and play was never resumed.
The University of Notre Dame has hosted two games at Soldier Field, as part of their Shamrock Series. The first was in 2012, against the University of Miami, with another, against the University of Wisconsin-Madison, following in 2021.

NFL playoffs
The 1985 NFC Championship Game took place at Soldier Field, where the Bears defeated the Los Angeles Rams 24–0.
The 1988 NFC Championship Game took place here, where the Bears lost to the eventual Super Bowl XXIII champions San Francisco 49ers 28–3.
The 2006 NFC Championship Game granted the Bears their second trip to the Super Bowl (their first in 21 years), with a 39–14 victory over the New Orleans Saints.
The 2010 NFC Championship Game matched the Bears against the Green Bay Packers, where the Bears were defeated by the eventual Super Bowl XLV champions 21–14.

Other Bears playoff games at Soldier Field:
1985 NFC Divisional Playoff: Chicago Bears 21, New York Giants 0
1986 NFC Divisional Playoff: Washington Redskins 27, Chicago Bears 13
1987 NFC Divisional Playoff: Washington 21, Chicago 17
1988 NFC Divisional Playoff: Chicago Bears 20, Philadelphia Eagles 12 (this game is best remembered as the Fog Bowl, where a dense fog covered the stadium, reducing visibility to 15–20 yards.)
1990 NFC Wild Card: Chicago Bears 16, New Orleans Saints 6
1991 NFC Wild Card: Dallas Cowboys 17, Chicago Bears 13
2001 NFC Divisional Playoff: Philadelphia Eagles 33, Chicago Bears 19.  This was also the last home game before the renovations took place in 2002.
2005 NFC Divisional Playoff: Carolina Panthers 29, Chicago Bears 21
2006 NFC Divisional Playoff: Chicago Bears 27, Seattle Seahawks 24 (OT)
2010 NFC Divisional Playoff: Chicago Bears 35, Seattle Seahawks 24
2018 NFC Wild Card: Philadelphia Eagles 16, Chicago Bears 15

College football
Northern Illinois Huskies play select games at Soldier Field, all of which have featured them hosting a team from the Big Ten Conference. Northern Illinois University (NIU) is located in DeKalb,  to the west on Interstate 88.
On September 1, 2007, NIU faced the University of Iowa in the first Division I College Football game at Soldier Field since the 2002 renovations. The Hawkeyes defeated the Huskies 16–3.
On September 17, 2011, the Huskies returned to play the Wisconsin Badgers in a game that was called "Soldier Field Showdown II". The eventual Big Ten champion Badgers topped NIU 49–7.
On September 1, 2012, NIU hosted the Iowa Hawkeyes in a season opener that was called "Soldier Field Showdown III". The Hawkeyes narrowly defeated the Huskies 18–17.

Notre Dame Fighting Irish football used the stadium as home field for the 1929 season while Notre Dame Stadium was being constructed. The school has used Soldier Field for single games on occasion both prior to and since the 1929 season, and boasts an undefeated 10–0–2 record there. At Soldier Field, Notre Dame has played Northwestern four times, USC and Wisconsin twice, and Army, Drake, Great Lakes Naval Base, Navy, and Miami once each.

Hockey
On February 7, 2013, the stadium hosted a high school hockey game between St. Rita High School from the city's Southwest side and Fenwick High School from suburban Oak Park.

The Notre Dame Fighting Irish and Miami RedHawks played a doubleheader on February 17, 2013, with the Wisconsin Badgers and Minnesota Golden Gophers in the Hockey City Classic, the first outdoor hockey game in the history of the stadium. A Chicago Gay Hockey Association intra-squad game was held in affiliation with the Hockey City Classic.

On March 1, 2014, the Chicago Blackhawks played against the Pittsburgh Penguins as part of the NHL Stadium Series. The Blackhawks defeated the Penguins 5–1 before a sold-out crowd of 62,921. The team also held its 2015 Stanley Cup Championship celebration at the stadium instead of Grant Park, where other city championships have typically been held, due to recent rains.

On February 7, 2015, Soldier Field hosted another edition of the Hockey City Classic. The event had been delayed due to unusually warm weather and complications with the quality of the ice. The 2015 edition of the Hockey City Classic featured a match between Miami University and Western Michigan, followed by a match between the Big Ten's Michigan and Michigan State On February 5, the organizers of the Hockey City Classic organized the Unite on the Ice event benefiting St. Jude Children's Research Hospital. The event was centered upon a celebrity hockey game with former NHL and AHL players, as well as a public free skate at Soldier Field. Participants in the celebrity game included Éric Dazé, Jamal Mayers and Gino Cavallini. Denis Savard was in attendance, serving as an honorary coach during the game. On February 15, 2015, Soldier Field hosted another Chicago Gay Hockey Association intra-league match in association with the Hockey City Classic.

Soccer

1994 FIFA World Cup

1999 FIFA Women's World Cup

CONCACAF Gold Cups

2007 CONCACAF Gold Cup 

2009 CONCACAF Gold Cup 

2011 CONCACAF Gold Cup 

2013 CONCACAF Gold Cup 

2015 CONCACAF Gold Cup

Copa América Centenario

2019 CONCACAF Gold Cup

Single events
Over 15,000 spectators attended the first leg of the 1928 National Challenge Cup (now known as the Lamar Hunt U.S. Open Cup) between soccer teams Bricklayers and Masons F.C. of Chicago and New York Nationals of New York City. The match ended in a 1–1 tie, and New York won the second leg 3–0 in New York City.
Numerous Men's and Women's National Team friendly matches.
Liverpool vs Olympiacos in the 2014 International Champions Cup with Liverpool winning 1–0.
Manchester United vs. Paris Saint-Germain in the 2015 International Champions Cup with PSG winning 2–0.
Bayern Munich vs. Milan in the 2016 International Champions Cup with the game resulting in a 3–3 draw and Milan winning the penalty shootout 5–3.
Site of the 2017 MLS All-Star Game, played on August 2, 2017, between Real Madrid and a group of all-stars representing Major League Soccer.
Manchester City vs. Borussia Dortmund in the 2018 International Champions Cup with Borussia Dortmund winning 1–0.
Venue for the 2019 CONCACAF Gold Cup Final, with Mexico defeating the United States 1–0.

Special Olympics
The first Special Olympics games were held at Soldier Field on July 20, 1968. The games involved over 1,000 people with intellectual disabilities from 26 U.S. states and Canada competing in track and field and swimming. In 1970, the second international games occurred, when Special Olympics returned to Soldier Field.

Rugby union
On November 1, 2014, the stadium hosted its first international rugby union test match between the United States Eagles and New Zealand All Blacks as part of the 2014 end-of-year rugby union tests. Over half of the 61,500 tickets were sold within two days. The All Blacks beat the Eagles 74–6. The stadium hosted its second international rugby union match on September 5, 2015, with the United States hosting Australia as part of the 2015 Rugby World Cup warm-up matches shortly before both teams were due to travel to England for the 2015 Rugby World Cup. The Eagles were defeated 47–10. On November 5, 2016, Ireland beat New Zealand 40–29 at Soldier Field as part of the 2016 end-of-year rugby union internationals – the very first time Ireland had beaten the All Blacks in a test match in 111 years of play.

Concerts

Other events

June 21–23, 1926: the 28th International Eucharistic Congress held three days of outdoor day and evening events.
September 22, 1927: The Long Count Fight, the second heavyweight championship bout between Jack Dempsey and Gene Tunney, was held at Soldier Field.
June 24, 1932: a war show celebrating the bicentennial of George Washington's birth featured Amelia Earhart.
May 27, 1933: Soldier Field held the opening ceremonies of the Century of Progress World's Fair. Postmaster General and DNC-Chairman James Farley facilitated the opening ceremony.
October 28, 1944: U.S. President Franklin D. Roosevelt made an appearance at Soldier Field, which was the only Midwestern speaking appearance he made in his last re-election campaign. This appearance was attended by over 150,000 (with at least as many people attempting to attend who were unable to gain admission).
April 25, 1951: Douglas MacArthur, US General during World War II, addressed a crowd of 50,000 at Soldier Field in his first visit to the United States in 14 years.
July 21, 1956: Glenn "Fireball" Roberts won the only NASCAR Grand National race held at the stadium's short track, which ran across the old configuration. Three Convertible Division races were held at the stadium.
June 21, 1964: the Chicago Freedom Movement, led by Martin Luther King Jr., held a rally here. As many as 75,000 came to hear Reverend King, Reverend Theodore Hesburgh (president of the University of Notre Dame, Archbishop Arthur M. Brazier, and Minister Edgar Chandler, among others.
July 10, 1966: the Chicago Freedom Movement held a second rally here. As many as 60,000 people came to hear Dr. King, as well as Mahalia Jackson, Stevie Wonder and Peter, Paul and Mary.
The early-to-mid 1980s saw the US Hot Rod Association host Truck and Tractor Sled Pull Competitions and Monster Truck exhibitions here. The engines on some of the vehicles would echo through the skyscrapers in downtown Chicago as they made their pull. Damage to the stadium turf on a few of the event occasion's led USHRA to move events to the Rosemont Horizon (known today as Allstate Arena).
1974: The Chicago Fire of the World Football League (WFL) played here before folding in 1975.
October 13, 1983: David D. Meilahn made the first-ever commercial cell phone call on a Motorola DynaTAC from his Mercedes-Benz 380SL at Soldier Field. This is considered a major turning point in communications. The call was to Bob Barnett, the former president of Ameritech Mobile Communications, who then placed a call on a DynaTAC from a Chrysler convertible to the grandson of Alexander Graham Bell, who was in Germany.
The stadium was listed on the National Register of Historic Places beginning in 1984. Its National Historic Landmark status was removed in 2006.
In the summer of 2006, the stadium hosted the opening ceremony of the Gay Games.
In 2012, United States President Barack Obama held the 2012 Chicago summit, a summit of the North Atlantic Treaty Organization (NATO), at McCormick Place and Soldier Field.
When the field and nearby Shedd Aquarium had to close to visitors due to the COVID-19 pandemic, Soldier Field became the exercise grounds for the aquarium's penguins.

In popular culture
 In the Marvel Comics event Siege, Soldier Field is inadvertently destroyed mid-game by Thor's friend Volstagg when he is tricked into fighting the U-Foes through Loki and Norman Osborn's manipulations of events. The stadium is later seen being rebuilt by the heroes after Steve Rogers is appointed head of U.S. Security, following the aforementioned event.
 The 1977 documentary film Powers of Ten focuses on two people having a picnic on the east side of Soldier Field.
 The stadium appears in the 2006 Clint Eastwood–directed movie Flags of Our Fathers, when the survivors of the Iwo Jima flag-raising reenact it for a patriotic rally.
 The opening match of the 1994 World Cup at Soldier Field was one of the five events covered in the ESPN 30 for 30 documentary June 17, 1994.
 Soldier Field features (much changed) in August 4017a.d. in From The Highlands short story in David Weber's anthology collection Changer Of Worlds. It appears to have gone through multiple renovations, rebuilds and even having been built over, until nothing but the open space of the original remained.
 In the 13th episode of Chicago Fires fourth season, Soldier Field is featured on one of their calls for a terrorist hoax. The stadium appears again in the 21st episode of the fifth season as one of their calls for a high angle rescue. This stadium is featured again in the eighth season as members of firehouse 51 respond to help victims of a deadly infection. It is also featured and referenced in the fifteenth episode of season 9 as the preferred location for a medal ceremony for firefighter Randy McHolland (Mouch).

Gallery

See also 
List of events at Soldier Field

Notes

References

Further reading

External links

 

 
Central Chicago
Sports venues in Chicago
American football venues in Chicago
Athletics (track and field) venues in Chicago
Boxing venues in Chicago
Buildings and structures on the National Register of Historic Places in Chicago
College football venues
Chicago Bears stadiums
Chicago Blitz stadiums
Chicago Cardinals stadiums
Chicago Circle Chikas football
Chicago Fire FC
s
CONCACAF Gold Cup stadiums
Defunct athletics (track and field) venues in the United States
DePaul Blue Demons football
1999 FIFA Women's World Cup stadiums
Major League Soccer stadiums
Former National Historic Landmarks of the United States
Ice hockey venues in Chicago
s
Leadership in Energy and Environmental Design certified buildings
Motorsport venues in Illinois
NASCAR tracks
National Football League venues
North American Soccer League (1968–1984) stadiums
Notre Dame Fighting Irish football venues
Outdoor ice hockey venues in the United States
Pan American Games opening ceremony stadiums
Pan American Games athletics venues
Projects by Holabird & Root
Rebuilt buildings and structures in Illinois
Rugby union stadiums in Chicago
Soccer venues in Chicago
Softball venues in Chicago
Sports venues completed in 1924
Sports venues on the National Register of Historic Places in Illinois
Tennis venues in Chicago
Tourist attractions in Chicago
United States Football League venues
World Football League venues
XFL (2001) venues
1994 FIFA World Cup stadiums
1924 establishments in Illinois
Stadiums that have hosted a FIFA World Cup opening match